Ivan Valerievich Tkachenko is the Minister of Health and Social Security of the Pridnestrovian Moldavian Republic (PMR). He was born on 24 December 1964 in Desantne, Izmail Raion, Odesa Oblast, Ukraine . He is of Ukrainian ethnicity.

External links 
 Link to biography and photo (English)
 Official website, PMR Ministry of Health and Social Security (Russian)

1964 births
Living people
People from Odesa Oblast
Transnistrian politicians